Islamic feminist views on dress codes include feminist views on the issues surrounding women's dress codes in Islam, focusing especially on the hijab and niqāb.

Islam requires both men and women to dress modestly, a concept known as hijab. Traditionally hijab refers to a range of behaviors and garments, but the term in many western countries now refers solely to a type of veiling in which women cover their hair and neck. There is mixed opinion among Muslim feminists concerning whether hijab should be imposed onto people by external forces.

Historical Context 
The Qur'an states that both men and women should be dressed modestly (33:59-60, 24:30-31; in translation by Ali, 1988, 1126–27). However, it does not use the words veil, hijab, burqa, chador, or abaya. Instead, it uses the words jilbab (cloak) and khumur (shawl). These garments do not cover the face, hands, or feet.

Until the third through the ninth centuries (Hijri) women prayed in mosques unveiled.

Community Interpretations 
Sufi groups such as Al-Ahbash do not make it mandatory for women to wear traditional Islamic clothing, even allowing jeans.

Views in opposition to the hijab 
Women in opposition to the hijab claim that whole body covering with the burka, chador, and other items of clothing is a cultural tradition that arose from a conservative reading of the Qur'an by male mullahs, and that the Qur'an itself does not require such covering.

Amara supported  France's ban of the garment in public buildings, saying "the veil is the visible symbol of the subjugation of women, and therefore has no place in the mixed, secular spaces of France's public school system." She also pointed to the fact that feminists in Algeria fought against wearing the veil, accusing those who criticized the ban as participating in neocolonialism. Mhenni expressed support for Tunisia's ban on the veil on similar grounds, claiming that acceptance of the veil would lead to acceptance of women's rights being limited.

Sihem Habchi, director of the French feminist movement Ni Putes Ni Soumises, expressed support for France's ban on the burqa in public places, stating that the ban was a matter of "democratic principle" and protecting French women from the "obscurantist, fascist, right-wing movement" that she said the burqa represented.

Views in support of the hijab 

There are Muslim feminists who see the veil as a symbol of Islamic freedom or otherwise attribute a personalized meaning to it. 

Feminists such as Leila Ahmed say the veil no longer represents "a woman's brainwashed submissiveness or at the very least her lack of choice" and note that many American Muslims have worn the hijab to show opposition to anti-Muslim discrimination following the September 11 attacks or to show solidarity with Palestine. 

Since 2012, the hijab has become more prominent in countries of the world where state law does not require women to wear the hijab. For some of these women the hijab acts as a statement of pride in Islam, femininity, and sexual identity rather than as a representation of the oppression of women. Feminist philosophers such as Luce Irigaray note that the veil can take on the role of empowerment regarding a woman's sexual difference from man.

Some feminists link the freedom to wear the hijab to women having a right over their own body. Publicist Nadiya Takolia adopted the hijab after becoming a feminist , saying the hijab "is not about protection from men's lusts," but about "telling the world that my femininity is not available for public consumption...and I don't want to be part of a system that reduces and demeans women."

Views emphasising the freedom of choice 

Rachel Woodlock, an academic and writer who conducts research on Islam and Muslims, points out that the wearing of hijab is contextualised by culture. 

Many modern Muslim feminists believe a woman's freedom of choice is the most important thing. She should be able to choose whether to wear the veil or not without being coerced or threatened. This view holds that in accordance with a Muslim feminist's personal expression Islamic faith, Muslim women should be able to define dress codes for themselves and what they deem to be empower and define them.

See also 
 Awrah
 Haya (Islam)
 Hermeneutics of feminism in Islam
 Hijab by country
 Purdah
 Types of hijab

Bibliography

References 

Quranic exegesis
Hermeneutics
Islamic feminism
Women's rights in Islam
Islamic literature
Islamic studies
Feminist theory
Feminist ethics
Hijab
Clothing controversies
Feminism in the Middle East
Feminism in the Arab world